Diosdado Miko Eyanga (born 10 October 1990) is an Equatoguinean swimmer. He competed in the 2020 Summer Olympics.

References

1990 births
Living people
Swimmers at the 2020 Summer Olympics
Equatoguinean male swimmers
Olympic swimmers of Equatorial Guinea